Radek Bonk (born 9 January 1976) is a former Czech professional ice hockey player who most recently played for Oceláři Třinec of the Czech Extraliga.

Playing career
Bonk was born in Czechoslovakia and began his hockey career playing for Slezan Opava in the Junior Czech league and Zlín in the Czech Extraliga. He moved to North America in 1993 with a goal of playing in the National Hockey League (NHL) and was signed by the International Hockey League (IHL)'s Las Vegas Thunder, with whom he spent the 1993–94 season as a 17-year-old. Bonk was an immediate sensation in the IHL and by the end of his first season of the North American brand of hockey he had registered 42 goals and 45 assists for 87 points in 76 games. NHL scouts took notice, and Bonk found himself at or near the top of all the top prospects lists for the 1994 NHL Entry Draft. Given his young age (17), size, and ability to quickly adapt to the more physical style of hockey in North America, Bonk became a "can't miss" prospect.

Bonk was drafted third overall by the Ottawa Senators in the 1994 NHL Entry Draft, the first forward selected. He returned to Las Vegas for the first half of the 1994–95 season while the NHL was shut down by the owners' lockout and registered 20 points in 33 games. His debut NHL season of 1994–95 was somewhat disappointing, and Bonk scored only 3 goals and 11 points in 42 games. His progress took some seasoning in his first five years of NHL hockey before he emerged as one of the league's most complete forwards by 1999–2000. He went on to play for the Senators for 10 seasons, eventually becoming the team’s #1 center under the tutelage of head coach Jacques Martin.

Bonk originally wore number 76 as a member of the Thunder and in his first two seasons in Ottawa, but switched to number 14 after new general manager Pierre Gauthier implemented a team rule prohibiting players from wearing "vanity numbers" (that is, numbers higher than the goaltenders). Thus, teammate Alexandre Daigle also switched to number 9 from his traditional 91.

A skilled player, Bonk was often criticized in the Ottawa media for his lack of aggression, despite his size. On the day of the 2004 NHL Entry Draft, he was traded to the Los Angeles Kings for a third round draft pick. The same day, he was traded to the Montreal Canadiens along with Cristobal Huet for Mathieu Garon and a third round selection in the 2004 draft. His most productive season points-wise was the 2001–02 NHL season when he produced 70 points for the Ottawa Senators.

On 2 July 2007, Bonk signed as a free agent with the Nashville Predators to a two-year contract.

On 22 July 2009, after 969 games in the NHL it was announced that Bonk agreed to a one-year contract with Lokomotiv Yaroslavl to continue his career in the Russian Kontinental Hockey League (KHL). After only seven games into the 2009–10 season, Bonk left Yaroslavl to return the Czech Republic with Oceláři Třinec in the Czech Extraliga on 8 October 2009. Radek posted 17 points in 39 games for the season with Oceláři to earn a two-year contract extension on 2 May 2010.

Bonk announced his retirement on 19 May 2014.

Personal
Bonk is married to a Canadian, Jill Sarcen, whom he met in Ottawa while a member of the Senators. They have sons — Oliver and Cameron, and daughters Kennedy and Maya.  He relocated with his family to Ottawa in 2015, where he plays in a recreational men's hockey league and coaches a youth hockey team on which one of his sons plays. His son Oliver played for Canada in the 2022 Hlinka Gretzky Cup, and also currently plays for the London Knights.

Bonk is an uncle of Patrik Bartošák, who was drafted 146th overall by the Los Angeles Kings in the 2013 NHL Entry Draft.

Awards
1993–94 — Gary F. Longman Memorial Trophy (IHL Rookie of the Year)
NHL All-Star Game – 2000, 2001

Career statistics

Regular season and playoffs

International

Transactions
 28 June 1994 — Drafted by the Ottawa Senators in the first round, third overall.
 26 June 2004 — Traded to the Los Angeles Kings in exchange for a third round draft pick (Shawn Weller).
 26 June 2004 — Traded with Cristobal Huet to the Montreal Canadiens in exchange for Mathieu Garon and a third round draft pick.
 2 July 2007 — Signed as a free agent by the Nashville Predators.
 19 May 2014 — Announced retirement from professional hockey.

References

External links

 

1976 births
Czech ice hockey centres
Czech expatriate ice hockey players in Russia
Las Vegas Thunder players
Living people
HC Oceláři Třinec players
PSG Berani Zlín players
Lokomotiv Yaroslavl players
Montreal Canadiens players
Nashville Predators players
National Hockey League All-Stars
National Hockey League first-round draft picks
Ottawa Senators draft picks
Ottawa Senators players
People from Krnov
Prince Edward Island Senators players
Sportspeople from the Moravian-Silesian Region
Czech expatriate ice hockey players in Canada
Czech expatriate ice hockey players in the United States